Irton Marx (born 1947) is a Brazilian journalist, politician, and gaucho activist. He is known for organizing a movement to separate the southernmost state of Brazil, Rio Grande do Sul, to form a new country called  "Republic of Pampas".

Early life 
Born in Hamburg, Germany, Irton came to Santa Cruz do Sul in 1947, aged just 11 months and 4 days. Along with his older brother, in addition to two others born in Brazil, he grew up in the region where a military base is located – where he even served in 1966. His parents worked in tobacco companies and, due to the persecution of German immigrants since the beginning of World War II, were discreet about the origins of the family.

Political life and activism 
He is the author of a book called A new country will be born: Republic of Gaucho Pampas about the separation of Rio Grande do Sul from Brazil. The project supposed that other neighbouring states with significant non-Portuguese population may secede from Brazil also for forming the Federal Republic of Pampas.

Due to his ideas of having a country where German and Italian would be official languages along with Portuguese, in 1993, after an interview on the most popular Brazilian TV channel, Rede Globo, he was accused of racism, fascism and nazism. He was considered innocent in all these accusations from Brazilian officials, and the accusers had to pay a value in money for causing him all the hassle.

In 1997, he decided himself to drop the "Pampas Independence Movement" for good.

External links 
 Programa Fantástico - 1/05/1993 - Separatismo no Sul do Brasil
 1993 - CURIOSIDADE: REPÚBLICA DO PAMPA, SEPARATISTA QUER CRIAR UM PAIS FORMADO SÓ COM ESTADOS DO SUL

References

1947 births
Living people
Brazilian people of German descent
Rio Grande do Sul politicians
Liberal Party (Brazil, 2006) politicians
Brazilian Social Democracy Party politicians
Solidariedade politicians
Brazilian journalists
Brazilian activists
Separatists
History of Rio Grande do Sul